Centre Court Tennis is a tennis game for the Nintendo 64 released in 1999 in Europe. It was released under the name  in Japan in 1998. Famitsu rated it 27/40. X64 Magazine rated it 80% and Consoles + rated it 89%. 64Power/Big.N magazine rated it 87% and TOTAL! magazine rated it 3.

References

1998 video games
Tennis video games
Multiplayer and single-player video games
Video games scored by Hayato Matsuo